Women's handball at the 1990 Asian Games was held in Beijiao Gymnasium, Beijing from 26 September to 5 October 1990.

Results

Final standing

References

Results

External links
Olympic Council of Asia

Women